Riaño is a former small municipality located along the Esla River in the mountains of the province of León, in the autonomous community of Castile and León, northern Spain. The village was across the river from Peak Gilbo. Located 3650 feet above sea level, it is in the Cantabrian mountains near the foothills of the Picos de Europa.

Due to planned construction of a dam and reservoir in the 1980s, for flood control and generation of hydroelectric power, the village and its lowlying farmland were to be submerged, as were six other villages in the associated dam project. The residents were relocated to New Riaño, built as a replacement higher above the reservoir waters. In 2010 the village had 532 residents.

Noted residents and natives
Imanol Arias, film actor

See also
 List of submerged places in Spain
List of missing landmarks in Spain
 Kingdom of León
 Leonese dialect

References

External links

 Photos of Old Riaño

Municipalities in the Province of León
1980s disestablishments in Spain
Demolished buildings and structures in Spain
Buildings and structures demolished in the 20th century